This article provides details of international football matches played by the Austria national football team from 2020 to present.

Results

2020

2021

2022

Scheduled fixtures

2023

Notes

References

Football in Austria
Austria national football team results
2020s in Austrian sport